A storepedo, or alternately storpedo, is a cylindrical storage container with an attached parachute. 

Resupplying troops in the jungle by air drop  during World War II was proving problematic. Regular parachutes were costly in both money and material. Drops without parachutes risked loss of the materials due to the impact.

The Australian Inventions Directorate in headed by Sir Laurence Hartnett tasked the Ordnance Production Directorate to produce a solution.

G.W Griffiths, on a secondment with the directorate, came up with the answer. to examine the problem. A shock absorbent heavy-gauge wire netting container to absorb the impact. Griffiths named this an 'Aeropak'. The design also allows for a parachute to be attached to slow the descent. 

The design was refined by Morris & Walker Pty Ltd of Melbourne. The printing firm added a three foot cardboard cylinder to carry 250lbs. A hessian parachute was also added. The hollow nose cone is hollow which also takes a proportion on the impact.

The Storpedo was test dropped from a C-47 aircraft at Nadzab in New Guinea in 1944.

The Storepedo was used by Australian and US forces in the South-West Pacific. Small aircraft, for example the CAC Wirraway, could carry the container. Use of smaller aircraft resulted in greater accuracy of the drops.   

The Storpedo was used to supply liberated prisoners of war in Timor following the 1945 surrender of Japan. 

After the war, the Storpedo was used to supply victims of flooding in New South Wales.

The names on the patent are E.R. Campbell, K.M. Frewin, F.W. Lennox and R.P. Morris.

External links 
State Library of South Australia - Photograph of a Storepedo being fitted to an aircraft 

Australian War Memorial - Williamtown, NSW. 1954-11-23. Storepedos just after release from a De Havilland Vampire Aircraft of No. 2 Operational Training Unit RAAF Williamtown. (Donor: R.C. Cresswell)

Australian War Memorial - Members of 121 Supply Depot Platoon, Australian Army Service Corps hold a storepedo in readiness for a dropping - Bougainville - 12 March 1945

References 

World War II military equipment of Australia
Australian inventions